The 1940 Taça de Portugal Final was the final match of the 1939–40 Taça de Portugal, the 2nd season of the Taça de Portugal, the premier Portuguese football cup competition organized by the Portuguese Football Federation (FPF). The match was played on 7 July 1940 at the Estádio do Lumiar in Lisbon, and opposed two Primeira Liga sides: Belenenses and Benfica. Benfica defeated Belenenses 3–1 to claim their first Taça de Portugal.

Match

Details

References

1940
Taca
S.L. Benfica matches
C.F. Os Belenenses matches